Longobardo is a surname. Notable people with the surname include:

 Anna Kazanjian Longobardo (1928–2020), former director of the engineering firm Woodward Clyde Group and a former executive at Unisys Corp
 Nicolò Longobardo (1559-1654), Sicilian Jesuit in China in the 17th century 
 Primo Longobardo (1901–1942), Italian naval officer and submariner during World War II

See also 

 Longobardi (surname)